DCPA can refer to:

 Denver Center for the Performing Arts
 DCPA, the herbicide propanil from its chemical name 3',4'-DiChloroPropionAnilide: especially in Japanese sources
 DCPA, the herbicide dimethyl tetrachloroterephthalate from an abbreviation used by the Weed Science Society of America. Use of these abbreviations can cause confusion between the two chemicals
 DCPA, anhydrous dicalcium phosphate the mineral monetite
 Depot cyproterone acetate